Fremantle is a surname. Notable people with the surname include:

 Arthur Fremantle (1835–1901), British soldier and American Civil War diarist
 Charles Fremantle (1800–1869), British captain of the first ship to arrive at the Swan River, Western Australia, in 1829 to establish a colony
 Edmund Fremantle (1836–1929), British Navy officer
 Elizabeth Wynne Fremantle (1778–1857), British diarist and wife of Admiral Thomas Fremantle
 Francesca Fremantle, scholar and translator of Sanskrit
 John Fremantle, 4th Baron Cottesloe (1900–1994), World War II soldier and businessman
 John Fremantle, 5th Baron Cottesloe (b. 1927), Commander of the Royal Navy
 Katharine Fremantle (b. 1919), art historian and academic
 Sydney Fremantle (1867–1958), Admiral of the Royal Navy

 Thomas Fremantle (Royal Navy officer) (1765–1819), Admiral of the Royal Navy
 Thomas Fremantle, 1st Baron Cottesloe (1798–1890) British politician
 Thomas Fremantle, 2nd Baron Cottesloe (1830–1918), British businessman and Conservative politician
 Thomas Fremantle, 3rd Baron Cottesloe (1862–1956), Australian army officer
 William Fremantle (politician)  (1766–1850), British politician
 William Fremantle (uncle) (1807–1895), Dean of Ripon, brother of the 1st Lord Cottesloe
 William Fremantle (nephew) (1831–1916), Dean of Ripon, son of the 1st Lord Cottesloe

See also
 Brian Freemantle (b. 1936), British author, creator of "Charlie Muffin"